Harmony Trail is a 1944 American Western film directed by Robert Emmett Tansey and starring Ken Maynard, Eddie Dean and Ruth Roman. Its early distribution was limited, and it was given a fuller release in 1947 by Astor Pictures under the alternative title of White Stallion.

Cast
 Ken Maynard as Marshal Ken Maynard
 Eddie Dean as Marshal Eddie Dean
 Gene Alsace as Marshal Rocky Camron
 Max Terhune as 	Marshal Max Terhune
 Glenn Strange as Marshal Taylor
 Ruth Roman as Ann Martin
 Robert McKenzie as Pop Martin 
 Charles King as Jim Sorrell 
 Bud Osborne as Henchman Tip
 Al Ferguson as Henchman Red
 Dan White as Bronco
 Fred Gildart as Sleepy - Doc's Assistant
 Jerry Shields as Henchman Tex
 John Bridges as 	2nd Sheriff
 Hal Price as Rancher Jeff Hodges

References

Bibliography
 Pitts, Michael R. Western Movies: A Guide to 5,105 Feature Films. McFarland, 2012.

External links
 

1944 films
1944 Western (genre) films
1940s English-language films
American Western (genre) films
Films directed by Robert Emmett Tansey
Astor Pictures films
1940s American films